Kalgadarreh or Kalgeh Darreh may refer to:
 Kalgadarreh 1
 Kalgadarreh 2